= Abhyudaya Nagar =

Coordinates: 17°21′N 78°23′E

Abhyudaya Nagar is a neighbourhood in Hyderabad at Vanasthalipuram, Telangana, India.

There is another neighbourhood with the same name in Mumbai at Kalachowki, Maharashtra, India.

It is a resettlement areas of 48 buildings spread over 33 acres in Kalachowki. It is called Maharashtra Housing and Area Development Authority (Mhada) colony. In 2025, tenders were floated to redevelop the colony.
